Euzophera pulchella is a species of snout moth in the genus Euzophera. It was described by Ragonot in 1887, and is known from the Balkan Peninsula.

The wingspan is 19 mm.

References

Moths described in 1887
Phycitini
Moths of Europe